Khaman is a savoury snack from India that originates from Gujarat. It is a steamed sponge with a fluffy consistency, often served with a garnish of fresh chopped coriander leaves.

Ingredients 
Khaman is made from ground channa daal or channa gram flour, usually with lemon juice, semolina, and curd. A final tadka can be added, using ingredients such as asafoetida and chillies.

Gallery

See also

Dhokla

References

Gujarati cuisine
Indian snack foods
Chickpea dishes